"The Paris of the Second Empire in Baudelaire" (1938) is one of a diptych of completed essays that was composed during the preparatory outlining and drafting phase of Walter Benjamin's uncompleted composition of the Arcades Project. "Paris, Capital of 19th Century" is its sister essay. The major themes of The Arcades Project—the construction of the Parisian arcades in the early 19th century, their blossoming as a habitat for the flâneur, their demolition during Haussmanization—appear as leitmotifs in both essays.

History 
Benjamin began translating Baudelaire's poetry in 1914 or 1915 when he was twenty-two years of age, and his work on these translations became intensive in the early 1920s. These translations, introduced by his essay "The Task of the Translator", were published in 1923. In the late twenties, he began to collect material and ideas for a history of the emergence of urban commodity capitalism in Paris around 1850 (this study eventually evolved into The Arcades Project). In 1935, while Benjamin was living in exile in France, Fritz Pollock, co-director of the Institut für Sozialforschung, suggested that Benjamin produce an exposé of the project, which came out in the form of the essay "Paris, Capital of the 19th Century."

In 1937, at the urging of Max Horkheimer, Benjamin reconceptualized the Arcades Project as a study of Baudelaire that would draw on the central concerns of the project as a whole. The reconceptualized project would have had three parts: (1) "Baudelaire as Allegorist"; (2) "The Paris of the Second Empire in Baudelaire"; (3) "The Commodity as Poetic Object." Michael Jennings describes the process of composition, "Working feverishly through the summer and fall of 1938 in [ ] Denmark, where he was the guest of his friend the great German dramatist Bertolt Brecht, Benjamin completed the middle third of the Baudelaire book and submitted this text as an essay entitled 'The Paris of the Second Empire in Baudelaire' to the Zeitschrift für Sozialforschung (Journal for Social Research) in New York." The institute rejected Benjamin's manuscript and told him to rework its central section ("The Flâneur") and then to resubmit it.

Instead of simply editing the original essay, he wrote an entirely new work for resubmission entitled "On Some Motifs in Baudelaire" which examines Baudelaire's work from the perspective of the 20th century. The cycle of reflections collected as "Central Park" was also written during the period that Benjamin was working on "The Paris of the Second Empire in Baudelaire" and amounts to a series of tertiary meditations on the subject that didn't make it into the final draft.

Summary 
"The Paris of the Second Empire in Baudelaire" is organized into three sections: (1) La Bohème (2) The Flâneur (3) Modernity. Each section is devoted to a large scale historical phenomenon of which Baudelaire plays the part of the exemplar or specimen.

In "La Bohème", Benjamin looks at the relationship between "professional conspirators" or "professional revolutionists" and the social milieu of Bohèmian circles in Paris. The first section begins with a meditation on the genre of physiognomies—pamphlets describing stereotyped social groupings in Paris—and how Baudelaire's poems complement this genre, even as they transcend it. In a summary of the section, Michael Jennings writes: "For Benjamin, the bohemians were not primarily artistes starving in garrets-think of Rodolfo and Mimi in Puccini's La Boheme-but a motley collection of amateur and professional conspirators who imagined the overthrow of the regime of Napoleon III, France's self-elected emperor. In the opening pages of the essay, Benjamin establishes relays between the tactics employed by these figures and the aesthetic strategies that characterize Baudelaire's poetic production."

In "The Flâneur" examines the relationship between the isolated urban individual and the crowd, looking at the ways in which the architectural changes and shifts in urban planning in Paris during the 19th century interact with and reflect the evolution of modernist perceptions and begin to crystallize into a new paradigm of consumerist sensibility.

Per Michael Jennings:

The final movement of the essay, "Modernity" marshalls and deploys the conceptual terminology that Benjamin has developed in the first two sections to make an argument that the cultivation of personal "taste" and the romanticization of "art for art's sake" are, in fact, a forms of repressive desublimation wherein individuals sacrifice personal wisdom or experience and in exchange are able to navigate and to 'enjoy' the process of shopping for mass-produced commodity products.

See also 
 The Frankfurt School
 Marxist hermeneutics

References 

German literary criticism
Works by Walter Benjamin
Contemporary philosophical literature
Works about Charles Baudelaire